Tadhg Corkery (born 1998) is an Irish Gaelic footballer who plays for Premier Intermediate Championship club Cill Na Martra and at inter-county level with the Cork senior football team. He usually lines out as a right wing-back.

Honours

Cill na Martra
Cork Intermediate A Football Championship (1): 2018

Cork
National Football League Division 3 (1): 2020

References

External link
Tadhg Corkery profile at the Cork GAA website

1998 births
Living people
Cill na Martra Gaelic footballers
Cork inter-county Gaelic footballers